Mindscar is an American heavy metal band from Orlando, Florida, founded in 1998. The band is led by guitarist/vocalist Richie Brown who has played with Trivium and Nader Sadek. Mindscar has toured with acts such as Vader and Vital Remains.

History 
Mindscar was originally formed by Richie Brown (vocals/guitar) and Mike Radford (drums) in 1998. In 2001, the band made a powerful impact throughout the Central Florida region performing numerous gigs, self-releasing demos & EPs, a television performance, international airplay and publicity. In 2002, Matt Heafy of Trivium joined the band on guitar and backup vocals. After internal issues due to the age of its band members, Mindscar was unable to tour and the band disbanded for an entire decade.

In 2012, Richie Brown and Mike Radford reunited in a recording studio to track 'Thornz Ov Ill Lechery' and 'Blind Masses'. The two tracks led to irrefutable performing and touring opportunities. Richie decided to resurrect the band in March 2013 and the first live performance in over a decade took place alongside Massacre in Tampa, Florida at the Brass Mug. Soon after Mindscar embarked on their first tour supporting Vader and Vital Remains on the Back To The Black US Tour 2013.

In 2014, Mindscar began tracking their debut full-length album titled "Kill The King". After embarking on the Southern Scorcher US Tour 2014 with Infinite Earths, Richie asked Terran Fernandez (the bassist from Infinite Earths) to join Mindscar. Terran has since become an essential part of the band. Matt Heafy contributed clean vocals for a few songs and a guitar solo for a song called "Asmodeus" that was premiered on Metal Injection in September 2014.

Mindscar independently released "Kill The King" on January 8, 2015 followed by a sold out hometown show with Andrew W.K., a headline show in San Juan, Puerto Rico and a US tour with Ulcer. After returning home from this tour, Mike Radford left the band for personal reasons and passed the torch to long time friend and drum extraordinaire Robbie Young (Nailshitter/Double Veteran). Shortly after Robbie joined the band, Mindscar completed their most successful tour to date: Golden Gods of Death US Tour 2015.

Members 

Current members
 Richie Brown – vocals, guitars (1998–present)
 Terran Fernandez – bass (2014–present)
 Tommy Beheler – drums (2017–present)
 Alyssa Day – guitar (2016-present)

Former members
 Mike Radford – drums (1998-2015)
 Matt Heafy – guitars, backing vocals (2002)
 Erich Geuter – guitars, backing vocals (2013)
 Jacob Belkerdid – bass, backing vocals (2013)

Touring musicians
 Kenneth Michael Reda – bass, backing vocals (2014)

Discography 

 Studio albums

 Demos

References

External links
 Official website

1998 establishments in Florida
American technical death metal musical groups
Musical groups established in 1998
Musical groups from Orlando, Florida